Anyone Can See is Irene Cara's debut album, released in 1982. This album followed up her successful hit singles "Out Here on My Own" and "Fame". The album is solid R&B featuring such standout songs as "Reach Out I'll Be There", "Slow Down" and the power ballad title track among others. Includes the hit, "Anyone Can See" which peaked at #42 on the Billboard Hot 100 chart.  It was produced by The Archies' Ron Dante.

Track listing 
 "Reach Out I'll Be There" (Holland–Dozier–Holland) – 4:27
 "My Baby (He's Something Else)" (Cara, Gordon Grody, Carlotta McKee) – 3:33
 "Anyone Can See" (Cara, Bruce Roberts) – 3:42
 "Don't Throw Your Love Away" (Cara, Gail Boggs, Josh Shneider) – 3:58
 "Slow Down" (Cara) – 3:53
 "Whad'ya Want" (Cara, Grody, McKee) – 3:35
 "You Hurt Me Once" (Alan Roy Scott, Ed Fox) – 3:39
 "Thunder in My Heart" (Leo Sayer, Tom Snow) – 3:39
 "Why" (Andy Goldmark, Jim Ryan) – 4:49
 "True Love" (Bill Seidman) – 3:46

Personnel 

Irene Cara – Vocals, Piano, Arrangements
John Tropea – Guitar
Luther Vandross – Background vocals
Hiram Bullock – Guitar, Keyboards, Clavinet
Don Grolnick – Keyboards
Ron Dante – Background vocals
Jimmy Maelen – Percussion, Conga
Bruce Roberts – Background vocals
Robin Clark – Background vocals
Paul Shaffer – Guitar, Piano, Keyboards, Clavinet, Fender Rhodes
Gordon Grody – Synthesizer, Guitar, Piano, Background vocals
Leo Adamian – Drums
Tawatha Agee – Background vocals
Phillip Ballou – Background vocals
Gail Boggs – Background vocals
Michael Carabello – Percussion, Conga
Joe Caro – Guitar
Francisco Centeno – Bass
Christine Faith – Background vocals

Babi Floyd – Background vocals
Yogi Horton – Drums
Bill Lee – Bass
Hugh McCracken – Guitar, Arranger
Jeff Mironov – Guitar
Andy Newmark – Drums
Chris Parker – Drums
Leon Pendarvis – Synthesizer, Guitar, Piano, Arranger
Jimmy Ripp – Guitar
Steve Robbins – Piano
Josh Schneider – Vocals
Bill Seidman – Guitar, Arranger
John Seigler – Bass
Annie Sutton – Background vocals
Ed Walsh – Synthesizer
Harold Wheeler – Guitar, Piano, Arranger
Ronnie Zito – Drums
Frank Floyd – Background vocals

Charts

References 

1982 debut albums
Irene Cara albums
Albums produced by Ron Dante